Hunter Reese and Jan Zieliński were the defending champions but chose not to defend their title.

Alexander Erler and Lucas Miedler won the title after defeating James Cerretani and Luca Margaroli 6–3, 6–1 in the final.

Seeds

Draw

References

External links
 Main draw

Sibiu Open - Doubles
2021 Doubles